8mm is a rock band from Los Angeles, California. 8mm was started by Sean Beavan (who formerly worked with bands such as Marilyn Manson, Nine Inch Nails and God Lives Underwater), and his wife Juliette Beavan. 8mm has toured internationally in countries such as the United Kingdom and Chile, as well as across the US and in parts of Canada. They released two albums before moving to ChelseaGirl Records. Their debut, appropriately titled Opener, was released independently. Their second, Songs to Love and Die By, was released on Curb Appeal Records. Since then, 8MM has released three albums with ChelseaGirl Records: On a Silent Night (2008), Love and the Apocalypse (2010) and Between the Devil and Two Black Hearts (2012). In 2019, they released an independent EP, titled Heart-Shaped Hell.

8mm was featured in the popular television show One Tree Hill twice with their songs "No Way Back" and "Forever and Ever Amen". The latter was featured in the episode "Songs to Love and Die By", titled after their second album. They also remade a version of Carly Simon's "Nobody Does It Better" which was used in the film Mr. & Mrs. Smith. Their song "Liar" was featured on Grey's Anatomy and on the season finale of Dirt. MTV used the track "Give It Up" on its hit show Road Rules and "Never Enough" for a preview of an upcoming episode of The Real World: Sydney. Their song "Around the Sun" from their album "Between the Devil and Two Black Hearts" also appeared in Canadian supernatural series Lost Girl, season 3 episode 2. Additionally "Forever and Ever Amen" was used for the second episode of CBS's Moonlight.

Discography

References

External links
 Official 8mm site
 8mm Facebook page
 8mm MySpace account

Musical groups from Los Angeles
Musical groups established in 2004
American musical trios
American pop rock music groups
Trip hop groups